Home is the debut album by American hip hop band Spearhead, released in 1994 on Capitol Records. It was produced by Joe "The Butcher" Nicolo and Spearhead frontman Michael Franti at Studio 4 in Philadelphia.

"Hole in the Bucket" was released as a single. It became an MTV Buzz Bin song and won a Clio Award.

Reception

Paul Corio of Rolling Stone wrote: "Spearhead lean slightly toward jazz, but their warm rhythm and Franti's supple voice keep things fresh. Lacking even an eighth of PE's heyday power, this crew still boasts a telling advantage: It knows what time it is."

Track listing

Personnel
Michael Franti – vocals
Mary Harris – vocals
Le Le Jamison – keyboards
Keith McArthur – bass
David James – guitar
James Gray – drums
Vernon Reid – guitar (solo)
Charlie Hunter – guitar

Charts

References

1994 debut albums
Michael Franti albums
Capitol Records albums